"Duele" is a song by the Mexican band Reik in collaboration with the Puerto Rican reggaeton duo Wisin & Yandel. The song was released as the fourth single from Reik's sixth studio album Ahora.

Charts

Certifications

References 

2019 singles
Reik songs
Wisin & Yandel songs
Songs written by Julio Ramírez
2019 songs